Andra River may refer to:

 A tributary of the Alba river in Romania
 Andra River in the Dibang Valley district of Arunachal Pradesh, India; see

See also
 Andirá River (disambiguation)